Darryl DeWayne Motley (born January 21, 1960) is a former Major League Baseball outfielder who played six seasons for the Kansas City Royals and Atlanta Braves between  and . In his MLB career, Motley played in 413 games, hit 44 home runs, 324 hits, 159 RBIs, and batted .243.

Career
Motley began 1985 as the Royals' starting left fielder, but after he struggled to begin the season, the team acquired Lonnie Smith on May 17 and moved the right-handed hitting Motley to right field to platoon with the left-handed hitting Pat Sheridan.

Motley, a right-handed hitting outfielder, hit a 2-run home run for the Royals against the St. Louis Cardinals in Game 7 of the 1985 World Series to give Kansas City an early 2–0 lead.  Motley's home run into the left field bleachers came on a 3–2 pitch, after he had hit the preceding 3–2 pitch to the same area in the stands, but foul.  Motley, upon seeing the ball curve foul, slammed his bat into the home-plate area, breaking it.  After selecting a new bat from the bat-boy, Motley delivered the fatal blow to the Cardinals. He also caught Andy Van Slyke's fly ball for the final out of the Series.

In 1986, Motley contended with Sheridan for the right field job. This time, the Royals released Sheridan at the end of spring training, but they signed Rudy Law to platoon with Motley, then traded Motley very late in the year, on September 23, to the Atlanta Braves for Steve Shields.

He also played four years for the Fargo-Moorhead Redhawks of the Northern League, from 1996 to 1999. In the team's inaugural season in 1996, Motley hit .346 with 26 home runs and 103 RBI in 82 regular season games.

References

External links
, or Retrosheet, or Pelota Binaria (Venezuelan Winter League)

1960 births
Living people
Adirondack Lumberjacks players
African-American baseball players
Algodoneros de Unión Laguna players
Allentown Ambassadors players
American expatriate baseball players in Canada
American expatriate baseball players in Japan
American expatriate baseball players in Mexico
Atlanta Braves players
Baseball players from Oklahoma
Cardenales de Lara players
American expatriate baseball players in Venezuela
Chiba Lotte Marines players
Evansville Triplets players
Fargo-Moorhead RedHawks players
Fort Myers Royals players
Gulf Coast Royals players
Indianapolis Indians players
Jacksonville Suns players
Kansas City Royals players
Major League Baseball outfielders
Minor league baseball managers
Nashville Sounds players
Nippon Professional Baseball outfielders
Northern League (baseball, 1993–2010) managers
Oklahoma City 89ers players
Omaha Royals players
People from Muskogee, Oklahoma
Petroleros de Poza Rica players
Québec Capitales players
Richmond Braves players
Rieleros de Aguascalientes players
Rojos del Águila de Veracruz players
St. Paul Saints players
Sultanes de Monterrey players
Tigres del México players
21st-century African-American people
20th-century African-American sportspeople
Grant High School (Portland, Oregon) alumni